Lethrinitrema is a genus of monogeneans belonging to the family Ancyrocephalidae. The genus was created by Susan Lim and Jean-Lou Justine in 2011 for parasites of lethrinid fish from New Caledonia.
All members of the genus are parasitic on the gills of fish.

Species
The following species are considered valid according to WorRMS: 

 Lethrinitrema austrosinense (Li & Chen, 2005) Sun, Li & Yang, 2014 
 Lethrinitrema chrysostomi (Young, 1968) Lim & Justine, 2011
 Lethrinitrema dossenus Lim & Justine, 2011
 Lethrinitrema fleti (Young, 1968) Lim & Justine, 2011
 Lethrinitrema gibbus Lim & Justine, 2011
 Lethrinitrema grossecurvitubum (Li & Chen, 2005) Sun, Li & Yang, 1914
 Lethrinitrema lethrini (Yamaguti, 1937) Lim & Justine, 2011
 Lethrinitrema nebulosum Sun, Li & Yang, 2014 
 Lethrinitrema zhanjiangense Sun, Li & Yang, 2014

References

Ancyrocephalidae
Monogenea genera